Shalimar is a perfume originally created by Jacques Guerlain in 1921 for French perfume and cosmetics house Guerlain. In production continuously since 1925, Shalimar is currently a flagship product for Guerlain.

History 
Shalimar was created by perfumer Jacques Guerlain in 1921, but after another company claimed to already have a fragrance by the same name, Guerlain was forced to rename the fragrance "No. 90" until a legal dispute over the name was settled. Shalimar was re-released in 1925 at the International Exposition of Modern Industrial and Decorative Arts.

Jacques Guerlain was inspired by Mumtaz Mahal, the wife of Shah Jahan, Mughal emperor of India, and for whom the Taj Mahal in Agra and the Shalimar Gardens in Lahore were built. The harmony of Shalimar was created when Jacques Guerlain poured a bottle of ethylvanillin into a bottle of Jicky, a fragrance created by Guerlain in 1889.

Raymond Guerlain designed the bottle for Shalimar, which was modeled after the basins of eastern gardens and Mongolian stupa art. Shalimar's blue, fan-shaped bottle topper was inspired by a piece of silverware owned by the Guerlain family. The bottle was manufactured by Baccarat Crystal and received the Decorative Arts Exhibition Award in 1925.

During the 1920s, Shalimar was popular with flappers which helped give it a "bad girl" reputation.

In 1985, Shalimar was repackaged and presented encased in a Lucite box to commemorate the 60th anniversary of its original launch. In 2004, Guerlain issued Shalimar Light by perfumer Mathilde Laurent. However, Shalimar Light was taken off the market and replaced by Eau de Shalimar in 2008.

Shalimar is preserved in its original 1925 formulation in the archives of the Osmothèque, donated by Jean-Paul Guerlain. As of 2017, Shalimar was Guerlain's second best selling fragrance, behind La Petite Robe Noire, with approximately 108 bottles being sold every hour.

Scent 
The fragrance contains notes of bergamot, lemon, iris, jasmine, rose, patchouli, vetiver, opopanax, tonka bean, frankincense, sandalwood, musk, civet, ambergris, leather, and vanilla. It is considered to be an Oriental perfume (see Fragrance Wheel).

Marketing 
Illustrator Lyse Darcy created many illustrated ads for Guerlain products, including Shalimar, from the 1930s through the 1950s. Photographs taken by Helmut Newton were used in a print campaign for Shalimar in 1997.

In 2013, Guerlain produced an advertisement titled "The Legend of Shalimar," featuring Natalia Vodianova. The advertisement was directed by Bruno Aveillan and featured music by Hans Zimmer that had been originally composed for The Da Vinci Code.

In popular culture

Music 
In his 1961 song about Ireland, "Forty Shades of Green", Johnny Cash wrote the line "where the breeze is sweet as Shalimar and there's forty shades of green".

In 1963, Eddie Barclay released an album called "Parfums", with one of the songs being named after Shalimar ("Shalimar de Guerlain").

In the musical La Cage Aux Folles, Shalimar is mentioned in the song "A Little More Mascara".

In the song "Madame George" from his 1968 album Astral Weeks, Van Morrison sings, "of sweet perfume...like Shalimar."

The lyrics of the song "On a Little Street in Singapore", contains the line "My sails tonight are filled with perfume of Shalimar".

Cheryl Bentyne's lyric for The Manhattan Transfer's 2018 cover of Grace Kelly's "Blues for Harry Bosch" includes two mentions of Shalimar, both in reference to the lyric's unnamed femme fatale, described initially as "her poison" and later, simply "the venom".

Film and television 
In the film California Split, the character of Helen Brown claims to be wearing Shalimar.

In the episode "In Camelot" of The Sopranos, Junior Soprano mentions sending bottles of Shalimar to Fran.

In the 1989 Gene Wilder and Richard Pryor movie "See No Evil, Hear No Evil", Richard Pryor's blind character identifies the villainess played by Joan Severance by the smell of Shalimar.

In the 1971 movie The Mephisto Waltz, Shalimar is the perfume favored by Jacqueline Bisset's character, Paula.

Shalimar is mentioned during an episode of The Love Boat (Season 1, Episode 3).

In the 1981 movie The Four Seasons, Shalimar is given as a gift.

Shalimar is mentioned during an episode of NCIS (Season 11, Episode 12).

In the Mad Men episode "The Long Weekend", Joan Holloway's roommate notices that Joan is wearing Shalimar.

In the 1988 movie Working Girl, Katharine asks Tess to get her bottle of Shalimar.

In an episode of Orange Is the New Black (S1:E6 "WAC Pack"), Nicky describes Piper as smelling of Shalimar after she receives a hug from her mother during visitation.

In season 2, episode 12 of The Nanny, Fran (Fran Drescher) remembers her aunt Mima smelling of stuffed cabbage and Shalimar under her mink coat. A season later, in season 3, episode 26, Mr. Sheffield (Charles Shaughnessy) is leaving the house to fly to Paris. When Fran tells him "Shalimar", he corrects her by saying it's "Au revoir", thinking she was telling him goodbye and not knowing she was actually asking him to buy Guerlain's Shalimar duty-free.

In season 3 episode 10 of Love, Mickey (Gillian Jacobs) tells her boyfriend Gus (Paul Rust) that his childhood home smells like "laundry detergent, ham, and Shalimar."

In season 1 episode 19 of "Person of Interest," villain Elias remembers his mother wearing Shalimar perfume.

In season 5 episode 11 of American Horror Story, while pouring herself a drink, the Countess realizes that Ramona Royale has entered her suite behind her back. Without turning around the Countess says, "It’s not the Shalimar that gives you away - it’s your blood."

Literature 
In the novel "L'Indic", by Roger Borniche the aristocrat Sylvia de Neyrac utilizes Shalimar to fascinate the policemen Roger Borniche.

In the novel "War Cry, by Wilbur Smith (with David Churchill), Saffron is caught attempting to descend the Cresta Run in St. Moritz (for male skiers only) due to her forgetting that she had used the perfume Shalimar following her morning shower. Reminded of the smell of the perfume by Herr Zuber, the equipment shop manager, she washes the perfume off prior to attempting the descent.

In the novel Angel of Baker Street, by Catherine Bell, Olivia always pictures her mother in her mind whenever she caught a hint of the perfume. Olivia is also given a bottle of Shalimar as a gift by Dominique, who had protected her during Olivia's stay in Paris.

In 1991, Louise Bourgeois created Cell II, a work of art which featured multiple empty and nearly-empty bottles of Shalimar on top of a mirrored table and next to a sculpture of wringing hands.

In the 1991 novel Wise Children by Angela Carter, Nora Chance wears Shalimar. This is the only way other characters can distinguish her from her twin sister Dora, who wears Mitsouko.

In the 2018 novel Greeks Bearing Gifts by Philip Kerr, the anti-hero, Bernie Gunther (alias Christof Ganz) comments upon Elli Panatoniou's Shalimar perfume as having the effect of "making a woman smell like a woman and making a man want to behave like a rampaging gorilla".

In the 2018 novel Lethal White by Robert Galbraith, the private detective, Cormoran Strike about his ex girlfriend, Charlotte "...could smell what he knew to be Shalimar on her skin. She had worn it since she was nineteen and he had sometimes bought it for her."

Mentioned in two Fannie Flagg novels, in the plot of one (Welcome to the World, Baby Girl) of which it is a clue to the mystery.

Shalimar is part of 4 pianopieces Dutch composer Carolien Devilee wrote on perfumes of Guerlain (4 Fragances de Guerlain pour Piano: l'Heure Bleue, Mitsouko, Shalimar, Chamade). 'Fragances' as noun for a new music form in which the music is based on a specific scent/fragrance.

References 

20th-century perfumes
Perfumes
History of cosmetics
Products introduced in 1925
Flappers